Withdean and Westdene Woods is a   Local Nature Reserve in four separate areas in Brighton in East Sussex. Most of the site is owned and managed by Brighton and Hove City Council. Withdean Woods is a  nature reserve managed by the Sussex Wildlife Trust.

Many of the mature trees on this site were destroyed by the Great Storm of 1987, but it still has a range of mammals including foxes, badgers and common pipistrelle bats, while there are birds such as great spotted woodpecker and firecrests.

References

Sussex Wildlife Trust
Local Nature Reserves in East Sussex